Rotating chair may refer to:
 Swivel chair, a chair with a single central leg that allows the seat to rotate 
 the role of a chairperson when served in turns by several members of a group

See also
 Chair (disambiguation)